The Type 1934 destroyers, also known as the Z1 class or Leberecht Maass class after the lead ship, were a group of four destroyers built for the German Navy (initially called the Reichsmarine and then renamed the Kriegsmarine in 1935) during the mid-1930s, shortly before the beginning of World War II. The ships were engaged in training for most of the period between their commissioning and the outbreak of war, although they did participate in the occupation of Memel in Lithuania, in early 1939. Z3 Max Schultz collided with and sank a German torpedo boat shortly before the war began on 1 September 1939. All four ships were named after German officers who had been killed in World War I.

Z1 Leberecht Maass fruitlessly attacked Polish ships during the invasion of Poland while her sister ships Z2 Georg Thiele and Z4 Richard Beitzen briefly blockaded the Polish coast. Later that month, the three sisters helped to lay minefields in the German Bight before they began patrolling the Skagerrak to inspect neutral shipping for contraband goods. Z3 Max Schultz joined them in early October. Z4 Richard Beitzen laid multiple minefields off the British coast in late 1939 and early 1940; she was joined by Max Schultz during one mission off Harwich in 1940.

In February 1940, while en route to attack British fishing boats as part of Operation Wikinger, Z1 Leberecht Maass, Z3 Max Schultz and Z4 Richard Beitzen were accidentally attacked by a Luftwaffe bomber. Z1 Leberecht Maass was struck by one bomb and sank with the loss of most of her crew. While attempting to assist her sister, Z3 Max Schultz struck a mine and sank with the loss of all hands.

Z2 Georg Thiele helped transfer troops to seize Narvik during the invasion of Norway in April and participated in both Battles of Narvik. She was forced to beach herself after she was severely damaged by British destroyers during the second battle. Z4 Richard Beitzen was the only one of the four sisters to survive the war despite several engagements with British destroyers in the English Channel in 1941 and her participation in the Battle of the Barents Sea in late 1942. She spent most of the rest of the war escorting convoys to and from Norway before the end of the war in 1945. Richard Beitzen was turned over to the Royal Navy and scrapped four years later.

Background
Design work on the Type 34-class destroyers began in 1932, despite the  limit imposed by the Versailles Treaty that had ended World War I. Initial designs were for large ships more powerful than the French and Polish destroyers then in service, but the design grew as the Reichsmarine now expected it to serve as a small cruiser. The Germans decided that they were going to ignore the restrictions since France and Britain weren't disarming, and an 800-ton destroyer would have been hopelessly outclassed by the destroyers being built by foreign navies. The specifications were finalized in 1934 and the four ships were ordered in July of that year. The design work appears to have been rushed and not well-thought out as the short forecastle and lack of flare at the bow compromised the ships' seakeeping ability and their stability was inadequate. The only real innovative part of the design, the high-pressure boilers, were an over-complicated design that received almost no shipboard testing before being installed in the Type 34s and frequently broke down throughout the life of the ships. By the time the ships were complete, Germany had already signed the Anglo-German Naval Agreement which essentially overturned the naval clauses of the Versailles Treaty and rendered their displacement legal.

General characteristics

The Type 34s were divided into 15 watertight compartments of which the middle 7 contained the propulsion and auxiliary machinery and were protected by a double bottom over 48% of the ships' length. Active stabilizers were fitted to reduce roll. They had a complement of 10 officers and 315 enlisted men, plus an additional 4 officers and 19 enlisted men if serving as a flotilla flagship, and carried two motor pinnaces and a torpedo cutter.

The effective range proved to be only  at 19 knots.

The ships were armed with five  guns in single mounts with gun shields, two each superimposed, fore and aft of the superstructure. The fifth gun was carried on top of the aft superstructure. Their anti-aircraft armament was made up of four  anti-aircraft guns in single mounts, with 8,000 rounds of ammunition, and six  anti-aircraft guns in single mounts, with 12,000 rounds of ammunition. They also had eight  torpedo tubes in two quadruple power-operated mounts on the centreline, with a pair of reloads for each mount. They had four depth charge launchers mounted on the sides of their rear deckhouse, which was supplemented by six racks for individual depth charges on the sides of the stern, with either 32 or 64 charges carried. Mine rails were fitted on the rear deck, with a maximum capacity of 60 mines. They carried a system of passive hydrophones, designated as 'GHG' (Gruppenhorchgerät), to allow them to detect submarines. The four ships cost a total of 54,749,000 marks.

The Type 34s were equipped with a C/34Z analog fire-control director on the roof of the bridge that calculated the gunnery data using range estimates provided by the two  stereoscopic rangefinders, one abaft the rear funnel and the other just behind the director. It transmitted the bearing and elevation data to the gun crews and then fired the guns simultaneously. A  rangefinder provided data to the 3.7 cm AA guns while the 2 cm guns used a hand-held  rangefinder.

Modifications
After the trials, several changes were made. A , a short keel that had a shallow wedge-shaped cross-section, was added under their transoms, in order to improve their turning circles and raise their sterns at high speed. This had the effect, however, of forcing the bow deeper into the water which aggravated the lack of sheer forward, throwing spray over the bridge, making No. 1 gun impossible to work and the upper deck hazardous to walk upon. A more serious problem was that it caused a continuous sagging force on the hull which required the reinforcement of the amidships hull plates to prevent cracking. The staukeils were removed in 1940–1942. In addition the upper bridge with its rounded front face was rebuilt into a more squared off shape to increase the space available. To reduce topweight, Richard Beitzen had her funnels reduced in height in 1942.

An active sonar system was scheduled to be installed aboard Richard Beitzen in June 1940, but it is uncertain when it was actually done by this date. During the war, the ship's light anti-aircraft armament was augmented several times. Improved 2 cm C/38 guns replaced the original C/30 guns and three additional guns were added sometime in 1941. The two guns on the aft shelter deck were replaced by a single 2 cm quadruple  mount, probably during her late 1941 refit. Richard Beitzen appears not have any additional AA guns added after this time. After mid-1941, the ship was fitted with a FuMO 24 search radar and later a FuMO 63 K Hohentwiel radar.

Ships

Service history

Z1 Leberecht Maass
On 3 September 1939, Z1 Leberecht Maass and her fellow destroyer  attacked the Polish destroyer  and minelayer  in Gdynia harbour with little effect. During this battle, she was damaged and sailed to Swinemünde for repairs. After this, she helped to lay defensive minefields in the North Sea. On 22 February 1940, while taking part in Operation Wikinger, she was attacked in error by a Heinkel He 111 bomber that hit her with at least one bomb, damaging her steering; the Kriegsmarine had failed to notify its destroyers that the Luftwaffe was carrying out anti-shipping patrols at that time, and had also failed to inform the Luftwaffe that its destroyers would be at sea. A court of inquiry convened during the war determined that she and Z3 Max Schultz were hit by bombs, but a post-war investigation determined that they had drifted into a newly laid British minefield.

Z2 Georg Thiele
When World War II began, Z2 Georg Thiele was initially deployed in the Baltic to operate against the Polish Navy and to enforce a blockade of Poland, but she was soon transferred to the German Bight where she joined her sisters in laying defensive minefields. She helped to transport troops to Narvik during the invasion of Norway in April 1940. On 10 April, five British destroyers, of the 2nd Destroyer Flotilla, surprised her and the other German ships. She and her fellow German destroyers managed to sink HMS Hardy and HMS Hunter, and damage the other three. She was hit seven times, which knocked out her forward gun and her fire-control equipment, and flooded one of her magazines. On 13 April, she was attacked by the battleship  and nine destroyers, and was damaged so severely that her captain ordered the crew to run her aground to allow her crew to abandon ship safely. She later broke in half and capsized.

Z3 Max Schultz
On 27 August 1939, just days before the outbreak of World War II, Z3 Max Schultz accidentally collided with and sank the torpedo boat Tiger near Bornholm. She was towed to Swinemünde for repairs that lasted until late September and thus did not participate in the Polish Campaign. She patrolled the Skagerrak to inspect neutral shipping for contraband goods during October. Late that month, one of her turbines exploded and the ship was under repair for the next several months. Max Schultz and two other destroyers laid 110 magnetic mines in the Shipwash area, off Harwich, on 9/10 February 1940. On 22 February, she took part in Operation Wikinger and attempted to go to the assistance of the disabled Leberecht Maass. In the process she hit a mine and sank with the loss of her entire crew.

Z4 Richard Beitzen
When World War II began in September 1939, Z4 Richard Beitzen was initially deployed in the western Baltic to enforce a blockade of Poland, but she was soon transferred to the Kattegat where she inspected neutral shipping for contraband goods beginning in mid-September. Between December 1939 and February 1940, the ship participated in three minelaying missions off the English coast. On 22 February 1940, Z4 Richard Beitzen took part in Operation Wikinger. The ship was in reserve during the Norwegian Campaign of early 1940 and was transferred to France later that year where she made several attacks on British shipping.

The ship returned to Germany in early 1941 for a refit and was transferred to Norway in June 1941 as part of the preparations for Operation Barbarossa, the German invasion of the Soviet Union. Z4 Richard Beitzen spent some time at the beginning of the campaign conducting anti-shipping patrols in Soviet waters, but these were generally fruitless. She escorted a number of German convoys in the Arctic later in the year. The ship was briefly transferred to France in early 1942 in preparation for the Channel Dash where she was one of the escorts for two battleships and a heavy cruiser as they sailed from Brest, France, through the English Channel, to Germany, before returning to Norway. Z4 Richard Beitzen escorted several heavy cruisers at the beginning and end of their anti-shipping raids in 1942. She participated in the Battle of the Barents Sea when Convoy JW 51B was attacked on 31 December 1942 near the North Cape, Norway.

Z4 Richard Beitzen spent much of 1943 escorting ships to and from Norway until she ran aground in November. Badly damaged, repairs lasted until August 1944, when she returned to Norway and resumed her former duties. The ship had another grounding incident in November and was under repair until February 1945. While escorting a convoy in April she was badly damaged by aircraft, and was still under repair when the war ended on 9 May. Z4 Richard Beitzen was eventually allocated to the British when the surviving German warships were divided between the Allies after the war. They made no use of the ship before scrapping her in 1949.

Notes

Citations

References

Further reading

 
World War II destroyers of Germany
Ship classes of the French Navy